Attorney General Follett may refer to:

Rosemary Follett (born 1948), Attorney General of the Australian Capital Territory
William Webb Follett (1796–1845), Attorney General for England and Wales

See also
Bronson La Follette (1936–2018), Attorney General of Wisconsin